Alpharetrovirus is a genus of the family Retroviridae. It has type C morphology. Members can cause sarcomas, other tumors, and anaemia of wild and domestic birds and also affect rats.

Species include the Rous sarcoma virus, avian leukosis virus, and avian myeloblastosis virus (AMV). Not all animals that can infect develop cancer. The tumor caused by the virus is usually in the form of lymphoma and leukemia. It occurs after a long and latent process. The tumor cells formed consist of a single progenitor cell and are clonal. However, infection from retroviruses does not directly produce tumors, but only placement and recombination events leading to tumor cell formation.

References

External links
 
 ICTVdb
 Viralzone: Alpharetrovirus
 

Alpharetroviruses
Virus genera